is a railway station in Ōzora, Hokkaidō, Japan, operated by the Hokkaido Railway Company (JR Hokkaido). It is the closest station to Memanbetsu Airport.

Lines

Station layout
The station is an above-ground station and consists of a single side platform serving a single bidirectional track. The station has no toilet facilities.

Adjacent stations

History
The station opened in 1947 as a temporary arrival and departure point for Asahino. From January 15, 1950, the station becomes a permanent passenger station and was renamed Nishi-Memambetsu. A freight platform was constructed in 1951.

The station became unstaffed from January 10, 1983.

Surrounding area
The station is a twenty-minute walk from Memanbetsu Airport.

References

 Teikoku's Complete Atlas of Japan, Teikoku-Shoin, Ltd. Tokyo 1990,

External links

 JR Hokkaido station information 

Railway stations in Japan opened in 1947
Railway stations in Hokkaido Prefecture